Northview Hills is a neighborhood within the city limits of Tampa, Florida. As of the 2010 census the neighborhood had a population of 938. The ZIP Code serving the neighborhood is 33610.

Geography
Nothview Hills boundaries are Ellicott Street to the north, Chelsea Street to the south, East Tampa (neighborhood) to the west, and East Lake-Orient Park to the east.

Demographics
Source: Hillsborough County Atlas

As of the census of 2010, there were 938 people and 341 households residing in the neighborhood. The population density was 3,335/mi2. The racial makeup of the neighborhood was 19% White, 74% African American, 1% Native American,  0% Asian, 4% from other races, and 2% from two or more races. Hispanic or Latino of any race were 12% of the population.

There were 341 households, out of which 21% had children under the age of 18 living with them, 23% were married couples living together, 36% had a female householder with no husband present, and 8% were non-families. 25% of all households were made up of individuals.

In the neighborhood the population was spread out, with 30% under the age of 18, 24% from 18 to 34, 18% from 35 to 49, 15% from 50 to 64, and 14% who were 65 years of age or older. For every 100 females, there were 91.2 males.

The per capita income for the neighborhood was $13,757. About 25% of the population were below the poverty line, 47% of those are under the age of 18.

See also
Neighborhoods in Tampa, Florida

References

External links
Northview Hills Civic Association 
Tampa City Council District 5 Information

Neighborhoods in Tampa, Florida